CHAI disease is a rare genetic disorder of the immune system that illustrates the role of CTLA-4 in cell signaling. CHAI stands for “Autoimmune lymphoproliferative syndrome due to CTLA4 haplo-insufficiency.” The disease is characterized by variable combination of enteropathy, hypogammaglobulinemia, recurrent respiratory infections, granulomatous lymphocytic interstitial lung disease, lymphocytic infiltration of non-lymphoid organs (intestine, lung, brain, bone marrow, kidney), autoimmune thrombocytopenia or neutropenia, autoimmune hemolytic anemia and lymphadenopathy. It is closely linked to LATIAE disease. Investigators in the laboratory of Dr. Michael Lenardo, National Institute of Allergy and Infectious Diseases at the National Institutes of Health first described this condition in 2018.

References

External links 
 www.orpha.net

Genetic diseases and disorders
Autoimmune diseases